Nephrocystin-3 is a protein that in humans is encoded by the NPHP3 gene.

This gene encodes a protein containing a coiled-coil (CC) domain, a tubulin-tyrosine ligase (TTL) domain, and a tetratrico peptide repeat (TPR) domain. The encoded protein interacts with nephrocystin and may function in renal tubular development and function. Mutations in this gene are associated with nephronophthisis type 3. Multiple splice variants have been described but their full-length nature has not been determined.

An association with renal-hepatic-pancreatic dysplasia has been described.

References

Further reading